Bunyamwera orthobunyavirus (BUNV) is a negative-sense, single-stranded enveloped RNA virus. It is assigned to the Orthobunyavirus genus, in the Bunyavirales order.

Bunyamwera orthobunyavirus can infect both humans and Aedes aegypti (yellow fever mosquito).

It is named for Bunyamwera, a town in western Uganda, where it was isolated in 1943. Reassortant viruses derived from Bunyamwera orthobunyavirus, such as Ngari virus, have been associated with large outbreaks of viral haemorrhagic fever in Kenya and Somalia.

Molecular biology 

The genetic structure of Bunyamwera orthobunyavirus is typical for Bunyavirales viruses, which are an order of enveloped negative-sense, single-stranded RNA viruses with a genome split into three parts—Small (S), Middle (M), and Large (L). The L RNA segment encodes an RNA-dependent RNA polymerase (L protein), the M RNA segment encodes two surface glycoproteins (Gc and Gn) and a nonstructural protein (NSm), while the S RNA segment encodes a nucleocapsid protein (N) and, in an alternative overlapping reading frame, a second nonstructural protein (NSs). The genomic RNA segments are encapsidated by copies of the N protein in the form of ribonucleoprotein (RNP) complexes. The N protein is the most abundant protein in virus particles and infected cells and, therefore, the main target in many serological and molecular diagnostics.

Disease in humans

In humans, Bunyamwera orthobunyavirus causes Bunyamwera fever.

References

External links 

Orthobunyaviruses